Water Street (Chinese: 水街) is a street in Sai Ying Pun, Hong Kong. It runs from Connaught Road, crossing Des Voeux Road West and Queen's Road West then climbing steeply up the hill crossing Second Street, Third Street and then end in steps to High Street and Pok Fu Lam Road conjunction. Originally, there was a nullah in the middle of the street carrying water from the hills down to the harbour. With the development of the area, the nullah was covered and used for hot food hawkers market for many years and this was a favourable night meeting spot for professional drivers such as taxis and trucks to have their dinner and late night gathering until the foodstalls were removed to give way for more traffic lanes.

There are 228 units in 8 buildings with addresses in Water Street. Most buildings on the street have addresses in the intersecting streets. One named building is Rockson Building.

Constituency

An electoral constituency in the Central and Western District Council is named after Water Street: Water Street Constituency. The boundaries of this electorate follow Bonham Road, Hill Road, Queen's Road West, Western Street. On 24 November 2003, an election elected Tai Cheuk Yin Leslie Spencer. 2,581 valid votes were cast. The estimated population of the constituency was 14,687 on 30 June 2003.

See also

 List of streets and roads in Hong Kong
 Water Street (constituency)

References

Sai Ying Pun
Roads on Hong Kong Island